Seán McGinley (c. 1952 – 1 November 2009), known as Seán Mac Fhionnghaile, was an Irish actor from County Donegal. He was known primarily for his comic roles, particularly for his leading roles in the TG4 sitcoms C.U. Burn and Gleann Ceo, as well as RTÉ Raidió na Gaeltachta comedy series Cois Cuan. He was executive producer for the 12-part series, FFC, and was a member of Aisteoiri Ghaoth Dobhair, an actors' group.

Early life
He was born Seán McGinley in Gweedore, County Donegal. His mother, Grainne, would survive him.

Career
Best known for his leading roles in television shows such as CU Burn and Gleann Ceo, he was executive producer for a further 12-part series, FFC, for TG4. He was involved in the RTÉ Raidió na Gaeltachta comedy programme Cois Cuan. He also established Cul a Tigh, a television production company. He transformed a run-down factory near his home into a training school and production centre.

Personal life
He and his wife Theresa had two daughters and two sons together. He died from cancer at the age of 57 on 1 November 2009. He had battled the disease for two years. His funeral took place at Saint Columba's Church in Brinalack, Gaoth Dobhair two days later.

References

1950s births
2009 deaths
Deaths from cancer in the Republic of Ireland
Irish male film actors
Irish male television actors
People from Gweedore
Date of birth missing
20th-century Irish actors
21st-century Irish actors